Everett Farmer (1902 in Shelburne, Nova Scotia – December 11 or 14 or 15, 1937 in Shelburne) was the last person in Nova Scotia to be executed.

Background

On the evening of August 1, 1937, Farmer shot and killed his half-brother Zachariah, then walked into town and turned himself in to police. Farmer said that the killing had been in self-defence, claiming that after a drunken argument, Zachariah had refused to leave Farmer's home, and had threatened to kill him.

Since Farmer was unable to afford legal representation, and the province of Nova Scotia had no legal aid system at the time, Vincent Pottier was appointed to represent Farmer free of charge.

The trial began on September 28, 1937, with Justice William F. Carroll presiding.

At the conclusion of the trial, the jury deliberated for less than two hours before finding Farmer guilty.

In December of that year, Farmer was hanged from a gallows that had been constructed in the Shelburne County Courthouse where his trial had taken place.

Aftermath
George Elliot Clarke has described the case as "suspect", in terms of how the prosecution, conviction and execution of Farmer may have been influenced not only by Farmer's inability to afford proper legal representation, but by the fact that he was black.

In 2005, Farmer's case served as the basis for Louise Delisle's play The Days of Evan.

References

1902 births
1937 deaths
Black Nova Scotians
Canadian people convicted of murder
Executed Canadian people
People convicted of murder by Canada
People executed by Canada by hanging
People from Shelburne County, Nova Scotia
People executed for murder